The Audie Award for Mystery is one of the Audie Awards presented annually by the Audio Publishers Association (APA). It awards excellence in narration, production, and content for a mystery audiobook released in a given year. It has been awarded since 1997.

Winners and finalists

1990s

2000s

2010s

2020s

References

External links 

 Audie Award winners
 Audie Awards official website

Mystery
Awards established in 1997
English-language literary awards